Aaron Homer Byington (July 23, 1826 – December 29, 1910) was the U.S. Consul in Naples from 1897 to 1907. He was a newspaper publisher and editor. He also represented Norwalk in the Connecticut House of Representatives from 1858 to 1860, and was a member of the Connecticut Senate representing the 12th District from 1861 to 1863.

He was born in Herkimer, New York, on July 23, 1826, to Aaron Byington and Sarah Waterbury.

Career 
Upon completion of his studies, he worked in a minor position at the Norwalk Gazette. When the New Haven Morning Chronicle began publication with Thomas G. Woodward as editor, Byington became business manager. He remained in this capacity until 1848, when he bought the Norwalk Gazette. In the Gazette, Byington editorialized for giving blacks the vote, a distinctly minority position at the time.

At the outbreak of the American Civil War, and before regiments of Northern troops had arrived to defend Washington, there was a report of a plot to burn the capital. On April 18, 1861, this report mobilized loyal citizens, including Byington, and former congressman Orris S. Ferry, also of Norwalk to form a militia. This militia was led by Cassius Marcellus Clay, and came to be known as the Cassius Clay Guard.

During the war, Byington worked as a lobbyist for Connecticut's arms manufacturers. Byington was a raconteur who eventually got to know Abraham Lincoln and swapped tall tales and jokes with him.

After the war Byington co-founded the New York Sun, along with Edmund C. Stedman and Charles A. Dana.

He was a delegate to the Republican National Convention from Connecticut in 1868 and an alternate in 1880.

In 1897, he suspended operations of the Norwalk Gazette when he was appointed by President William McKinley United States Consul in Naples. He served until 1907.

Byington died on December 29, 1910, in Flushing, New York.

References 

1826 births
1910 deaths
American consuls
American newspaper editors
Burials in Riverside Cemetery (Norwalk, Connecticut)
Republican Party Connecticut state senators
Republican Party members of the Connecticut House of Representatives
Politicians from Norwalk, Connecticut
Writers from Norwalk, Connecticut
People from Herkimer, New York
American war correspondents
19th-century American newspaper publishers (people)
19th-century American politicians